Belobranchus belobranchus, the throat-spine gudgeon, is a species of fish in the family Eleotridae native to Indonesia, the Philippines, New Guinea, Timor-Leste, Solomon Islands, New Caledonia and Fiji where it can be found in fresh and brackish water in coastal streams and estuaries. This species was the only known member of its genus, until Belobranchus segura was described in 2012.

References

Eleotridae
Taxa named by Achille Valenciennes
Fish described in 1837